The American Legend AL3C-100 and American Legend AL11C-100 are new design American light-sport aircraft inspired by the Piper J-3 Cub and Super Cub.

Design
The Legend Cub is built closely along the lines of the original Piper Cub with modern materials, engines and instruments. The aircraft is a high-wing, tandem seat monoplane with conventional landing gear. The fuselage is constructed with welded steel tubing with doped Superflite aircraft fabric.

In April 2015 the Super Legend design was further developed with the addition of a greater number of carbon fibre components, including doors, floorboards, the propeller spinner and the wingtip bows. Avionic upgrades include Garmin G3X avionics and a FreeFlight Systems 1201 WAAS GPS sensor, Trig Mode S and 1090ES ADS-B Out transponder.

Variants
 Diesel Engine
 In July 2015, American Legend Aircraft and Superior Air Parts (makers of the Gemini engine) announced that the 100-horsepower Gemini turbo-charged diesel engine would be available in 2016 as an option throughout the American Legend product line. The engine burns widely available Jet A and/or diesel fuel; an important consideration as normal aviation 100LL gasoline is expensive or unavailable in many remote areas. Power, price and weight are said to be comparable to the existing Continental O-200 avgas engine, but with a 20% lower fuel burn.   
AL11C-100 
Designed to resemble a Piper PA-11 Cub Special with an enclosed cowling.
AL3C-100
Designed to resemble a Piper J-3 Cub with cylinders exposed through the cowling.
AL11J-120
Powered with a  Jabiru 3300 engine.

AL18 Super Legend 
Lycoming IO-233 powered variant designed to resemble a Piper PA-18 Super Cub. Kevlar and carbon fiber floats certified for aircraft in 2015. 2015 Super Legend re-engined with Lycoming YO-233 115hp variant accepting 100LL AvGas and Automotive Fuel.

MOAC
Introduced in July 2020, it features large flaps that deploy to 40°, leading-edge slats and square wingtips all intended to improve low-speed handling. The variant is available as a light-sport aircraft or homebuilt aircraft kit.
Texas Sport Cub
Homebuilt kit.

Specifications (AL3C-100)

See also

References

External links

2000s United States sport aircraft